Kieran James Bird (born 2 September 1999) is a British swimmer. He competed in the men's 400 metre freestyle event at the 2020 European Aquatics Championships, in Budapest, Hungary.

Biography
Bird attended Millfield School.

References

External links
 

1999 births
Living people
People from Bicester
Sportspeople from Oxfordshire
British male swimmers
British male freestyle swimmers
Swimmers at the 2020 Summer Olympics
Olympic swimmers of Great Britain
20th-century British people
21st-century British people
Swimmers at the 2022 Commonwealth Games
Commonwealth Games competitors for Wales
European Aquatics Championships medalists in swimming
People educated at Millfield